Protoopalina hylarum is a species of  protozoa in the Opalinidae family, and an amphibian parasite. It was first described in 1911 by Janet W. Raff as Opalina hylarum.

Hosts 
This parasite has been found in the green and golden bell frog Litoria aurea, but has also been reported in the Cane toad (Rhinella marina).

References 

Placidozoa
Taxa described in 1911